Cotys II or Kotys II (Tiberios Iulios Kotys Philocaesar Philoromaios Eusebes, flourished 2nd century, died 131) was a prince and Roman client king of the Bosporan Kingdom. Like many other later Bosporan kings, Cotys II is known mainly from coinage, alongside a few inscriptions and contemporary writings. His coins are known from the period 123–131. Cotys II is known to have been the son of his predecessor Sauromates I. His relationship to later kings is not known for certain, but it is possible that his two immediate successors Rhoemetalces and Eupator were his sons.

During his reign, the city of Chersonesus Taurica was under his direct control. Cotys II is mentioned in the writings of the Roman Historian Arrian and was a contemporary to the rule of the Roman emperor Hadrian.

See also
 Bosporan Kingdom
 Roman Crimea

Sources

 Encyclopedia of ancient Greece By Nigel Guy Wilson Edition: illustrated Published by Routledge, 2006 , 

Monarchs of the Bosporan Kingdom
2nd-century monarchs in Europe
Cotys 2, Tiberius